Mrs Rock or Mrs Edward Anthony Rock or Miss Essex ( – 1779 or after) was a British actor who died in 1779 or some time after. She played at the best theatres in London in minor roles. Her reviews record her poor acting, but there is a portrait of her (in a role she is thought never to have played) in the Garrick Club.

Life
Miss Essex first appeared in  The Contract" at the Haymarket Theatre in 1779.

In December 1787 she appeared at the Covent Garden Theatre after a long period playing in the provinces. She was now married to Edward Anthony Fox and using his name. Her salary was 75 shillings a week whilst her husband was earning only 30 shillings a week. She took the role as Columbine in the pantomime on Boxing Day. She was known for getting poor reviews. The following season her salary was reduced to thirty shillings a week.

On 16 July 1790 she appeared  in She Would and She Would Not or The Kind Imposter by Colley Cibber at Covent Garden. There is a painting of her playing Viletta'' in this play by Samuel De Wilde, however the Garrick Club note that she never played the role (in London) although she did appear in the role of Rosa but for one night only. The painting was engraved by J.Thornthwaite and published the following year.

She is presumed to have died in 1793 as she was not mentioned again although her husband went on to appear until 1815.

References

1779 deaths
18th-century British actresses
British stage actresses